Vivacious Lady is a 1938 American black-and-white romantic comedy film directed by George Stevens and starring Ginger Rogers and James Stewart. It was released by RKO Radio Pictures. The screenplay was written by P.J. Wolfson and Ernest Pagano and adapted from a short story by I. A. R. Wylie. The music score was by Roy Webb and the cinematography by Robert De Grasse.

The film is a story of love at first sight between a young botany professor and a nightclub singer. The film's comedic elements include repeatedly frustrated attempts by the newlywed couple to find a moment alone with each other. Among the supporting players are James Ellison, Frances Mercer, Beulah Bondi, Franklin Pangborn, and Charles Coburn, as well as an uncredited appearance by Hattie McDaniel.

Plot

Botany professor Peter Morgan Jr. (Stewart) is sent to Manhattan to retrieve his playboy cousin Keith (Ellison) and immediately falls in love with nightclub singer Francey (Rogers). After a whirlwind one-day courtship, Peter and Francey get married, and they and Keith return to the Morgan family's home, where Peter teaches at the university run by his father Peter Morgan Sr. (Coburn).  Mr. Morgan is known for being a proud, overbearing man, so Peter is afraid to tell him about the marriage. When they arrive, Mr. Morgan and Peter's high-society fiancée Helen (Mercer) initially take Francey for another of Keith's girlfriends. While Peter decides how to approach his father with the news, Francey stays at a women-only hotel, and Peter and Keith introduce her as a new botany student.

Peter mentions Francey to his father twice, but on both occasions, Mr. Morgan interrupts and ignores his son, and when Peter becomes insistent, his apparently ailing mother (Bondi) has a flare-up of her heart condition, making any further conversation impossible. For his third attempt, Peter decides to announce the marriage to his parents at the university's student-faculty prom.  Keith brings Francey to the prom as his own guest, and Francey, still posing as a student, develops a friendly rapport with Mrs. Morgan, but gets into a nasty brawl with Helen in which Francey accidentally punches Peter's father.

Peter says nothing at the prom, but blurts the news to his father just as Mr. Morgan is about to give an important speech, resulting in another argument and another flare-up of Mrs. Morgan's heart condition. This prevents Mrs. Morgan from learning who Francey is, but she accidentally finds out from Francey herself during a conversation in Francey's apartment. Mrs. Morgan accepts the news happily, and admits to Francey that she pretends to have heart trouble any time her husband gets into an argument, but Mr. Morgan demands that Francey leave Peter, threatening to fire him if she doesn't.  Francey agrees to leave, but the incident releases thirty years of marital frustration in Mrs. Morgan, who also decides to leave her husband.

Francey tells Peter she is leaving him.  He vows that he can change his father's mind before her train departs. Peter's solution is to threaten the family with disgrace by getting drunk and otherwise misbehaving until his father relents, even if it costs him his job. Peter passes out before he can reach the train, which departs with both Francey and Mrs. Morgan aboard, but Mr. Morgan, having finally yielded to the combined pressure of his son and wife, stops the train by driving ahead of it with Peter and parking the car on the track. Both marriages are saved, and Peter and Francey finally have their honeymoon on the train.

Cast

Production
Vivacious Lady marked one of James Stewart's earliest starring roles. Ginger Rogers recommended Stewart as her leading man in this film. Although neither actor collaborated on any prior work, the two were dating at the time.

After four days of shooting in April 1937, Stewart became ill, but then left to costar in Of Human Hearts. RKO considered replacing Stewart, but shelved the production until December 1937. Actors Donald Crisp and Fay Bainter, who were cast in the original production, were replaced by Charles Coburn and Beulah Bondi.

Reception
The film made a profit of $75,000.

In the early 1960s, Steve McQueen announced that he wanted to appear in a remake, but this did not eventuate.

Awards and nominations
Vivacious Lady was nominated for two Oscars, for Best Cinematography and Best Sound, Recording (John O. Aalberg). George Stevens won a Special Recommendation Award at the 1938 Venice Film Festival.

Adaptations to other media
Vivacious Lady was adapted as a radio play on the April 7, 1940 episode of The Screen Guild Theater with Ginger Rogers and Fred MacMurray, the January 6, 1941 episode of Lux Radio Theatre with Alice Faye and Don Ameche, the October 2, 1945 episode of CBS's Theater of Romance with Robert Walker and Lurene Tuttle, the December 3, 1945 Screen Guild Theater with James Stewart and Janet Blair and on the August 14, 1946 episode of Academy Award Theater with Lana Turner. It was also presented on Philip Morris Playhouse February 13, 1942, with Madeleine Carroll starring.

References

External links

1938 films
1938 romantic comedy films
1930s screwball comedy films
American romantic comedy films
American screwball comedy films
American black-and-white films
Films directed by George Stevens
Films about proms
RKO Pictures films
Films based on works by I. A. R. Wylie
Films scored by Roy Webb
1930s English-language films
1930s American films